The Spencer Gulf is the westernmost and larger of two large inlets (the other being Gulf St Vincent) on the southern coast of Australia, in the state of South Australia, facing the Great Australian Bight. It spans from the Cape Catastrophe and Eyre Peninsula in the west to Cape Spencer and Yorke Peninsula in the east.

The largest towns on the gulf are Port Lincoln, Whyalla, Port Pirie, and Port Augusta. Smaller towns on the gulf include Tumby Bay, Port Neill, Arno Bay, Cowell, Port Germein, Port Broughton, Wallaroo, Port Hughes, Port Victoria, Port Rickaby, Point Turton, and Corny Point.

History
The first recorded exploration of the gulf was that of Matthew Flinders in February 1802. Flinders navigated inland from the present location of Port Augusta to within  of the termination of the water body.

The gulf was named Spencer's Gulph by Flinders on 20 March 1802, after George John Spencer, the 2nd Earl Spencer.  The Baudin expedition visited the gulf after Flinders with Nicholas Baudin giving it the name Golfe Bonaparte and Louis de Freycinet using the name Golfe  de la Melomanie on the expedition's published charts.

By the 1830s, the natural harbour of Port Lincoln had become the site of an unofficial settlement, due in part to its convenience as a base for whaling vessels – which had long operated in the Great Australian Bight.  Prior to the selection of Adelaide, some consideration was given to Port Lincoln as the potential site of a capital city.

Geography and topography
The western shore of the gulf is the Eyre Peninsula, while the eastern side is the Yorke Peninsula, which separates it from the smaller Gulf St Vincent. Its entrance was defined by Matthew Flinders in 1802 as a line from Cape Catastrophe on Eyre Peninsula to Cape Spencer on Yorke Peninsula. This so-called extension of the gulf consists of a land depression and occasional watercourse known as the Pirie–Torrens corridor, and the inland waterbody Lake Torrens.

The northern end of the gulf is spanned by the Joy Baluch AM Bridge between Port Augusta and Port Augusta West and further north by Yorkey Crossing.

Informal names for subdivisions of the gulf waters are sometimes used. "Northern Spencer Gulf" refers to waters north of Wallaroo and Arno Bay, while "Southern Spencer Gulf" refers to waters south of that line, extending to the mouth of the gulf. "Upper Spencer Gulf" includes the waters north of Port Pirie, and includes the three towns sometimes referred to as the Iron Triangle: Whyalla, Port Augusta and Port Pirie. Its boundary lacks precise definition.

Wildlife

The land surrounding the gulf, consisting of the Eyre and Yorke Peninsulas, is the Eyre Yorke Block bioregion. This was originally wooded shrubland but has now mainly been cleared for agriculture. The arid Gawler bioregion extends to the Spencer Gulf on the north-west. Many of South Australia's iconic marine species can be found on the shores and in the waters of Spencer Gulf.

Marine species 
The rocky inshore reef along the coast near Port Bonython and Point Lowly is a breeding ground for the Northern Spencer Gulf population of Australian giant cuttlefish. They are a favorite food of local bottlenose dolphins, who have developed sophisticated techniques for safely eating these creatures. The Upper Spencer Gulf is also known for its snapper and Yellowtail kingfish fishing. Great white sharks are sometimes seen in Spencer Gulf by fishermen, and shark cage diving and surface tours operate out of Port Lincoln.

A relic population of tiger pipefish (Filicampus tigris), a subtropical species is range limited to Northern Spencer Gulf.

Marine mammals 
Visiting southern right whales and humpback whales enter Spencer Gulf from June through to October, and can be seen as far north as Point Lowly and Port Augusta. New Zealand fur seals and Australian sea lions can be found in southern Spencer Gulf, with significant breeding colonies located at Dangerous Reef and in the Sir Joseph Banks Group. Occasional sightings occurring in Northern Spencer Gulf. Bottlenose dolphins can be seen in the gulf's waters year-round.

Seabirds 
Breeding colonies of little penguins exist on islands in Spencer Gulf. The northernmost colonies are located at Lipson Island and Wardang Island. In 2004, the Wardang Island colony's population was approximately 8,000 penguins. Cape Barren geese and several species of cormorants also breed on islands in Spencer Gulf.

Islands 
Spencer Gulf contains a number of inshore and offshore islands. These include (from north to south): 
 Curlew Island (south of Port Augusta)
 Weeroona Island (north of Port Pirie)
 Shag Island (north of Port Broughton)
 Entrance Island (near Cowell)
 Bird Islands (near Wallaroo)
 Lipson Island (north of Tumby Bay)
 Tumby Island (south of Tumby Bay)
 Wardang Island & the Goose Island group (near Port Victoria)
 The Sir Joseph Banks Group (offshore from Tumby Bay)
 Louth Island & Rabbit Island (in Louth Bay)
 Boston Island (in Boston Bay)
 Grantham Island and Bicker Isles (in Proper Bay)
 Donington Island, Carcase Rock, Owen Island, Taylor Island, Grindal Island, Little Island, Lewis Island, Smith Island, Hopkins Island and Thistle Island (east of the Jussieu Peninsula).
 Middle Island, South Island and Royston Island (in Pondalowie Bay)
 Gambier Islands including Wedge Island (in the mouth of Spencer Gulf)

Port development proposals 
Due to its proximity to many identified mineral deposits in South Australia's Far North, Eyre Peninsula and Braemar regions, there are multiple new port and harbour developments proposed for the region.

These include new or expanded facilities at (from north to south):
 Port Bonython - Port Bonython Bulk Commodities Export Facility - Spencer Gulf Port Link (proposed 2012)
Port Playford - Iron ore transshipment port proposed to be constructed on the site of the former Playford A Power Station, south of Port Augusta
 Whyalla - Inner harbour expansion - Arrium (completed 2013)
 Port Pirie - Possible expansion for trans-shipment of iron ore from the Braemar region (concept stage)
 Lucky Bay - Lucky Bay Common User Export Facility (harbour expansion) - SeaSA (proposed 2013, construction commenced 2014)
 Myponie Point - Possible port location for Braemar region mineral exports (concept stage)
 Cape Hardy - Iron Road Limited (proposed 2013)
 Lipson Cove - Port Spencer (formerly known as Sheep Hill) - Centrex Metals (proposed 2011) The port could be completed in 2023.

Seawater desalination plants 
In 2022, the government of South Australia announced the Northern Water Supply Project, which as of 2023, is considering a business case for establishing a large seawater desalination plant in the upper Spencer Gulf. If constructed, water will be supplied for use to the Olympic Dam and Carapateena copper mines in the state's far north. 

, one reverse osmosis and one thermal seawater desalination plant draw water from Spencer Gulf. Several others are planned. All currently or will produce water primarily or exclusively for industrial use. They are:

Spencer Gulf in film & video 
The Spencer Gulf region, its wildlife and its development are the subjects of a documentary film in production entitled Cuttlefish Country.

Protected areas

Reserves declared by the South Australian government

Aquatic Reserves
Spencer Gulf contains four aquatic reserves.

Blanche Harbour-Douglas Bank Aquatic Reserve which is located in west side of Spencer
Gulf, north of Whyalla, was declared in 1980 ‘for fisheries management, protection of its mangrove-seagrass communities and associated fish nursery areas.’	

Goose Island Aquatic Reserve which is located at Goose Island on the east side of Spencer Gulf near Port Victoria was declared in 1971 to provide ‘a conservation area where teaching institutions may conduct classes and scientific research on marine biology and ecology and to protect the habitat of the seal colony situated on White Rocks.’

Whyalla - Cowleds Landing Aquatic Reserve which is located in on the west side of Spencer Gulf, just south of Whyalla, was declared in 1980 to ‘protect the mangrove-seagrass communities and associated fish nursery areas.’

Yatala Harbour Upper Spencer Gulf Aquatic Reserve which is located in Yatala Harbour on the east side of Spencer Gulf, north of Port Pirie, was declared in 1980 for ‘the protection of its mangrove-seagrass communities and associated fish nursery areas.’

Marine Parks 
Spencer Gulf contains five marine parks, each with its own outer boundary and internal zoning. Fishing is prohibited with Sanctuary Zones, and detailed maps and GPS coordinates for the parks are available from the Government of South Australia's Department of Environment, Water & Natural Resources.

The marine parks within Spencer Gulf are (from north to south):
 Upper Spencer Gulf Marine Park
 Franklin Harbor Marine Park
 Eastern Spencer Gulf Marine Park 
 Sir Joseph Banks Group Marine Park
 Southern Spencer Gulf Marine Park

Terrestrial reserves
A number of terrestrial reserves either adjoin Spencer Gulf at low water or are located on islands within the gulf.  On the west coast of the gulf, from north to south, they are Munyaroo Conservation Park, Franklin Harbor Conservation Park, Lipson Island Conservation Park, Tumby Island Conservation Park, Sir Joseph Banks Group Conservation Park, Lincoln National Park and Memory Cove Wilderness Protection Area.  On the east coast of the gulf, from north to south, they are Winninowie Conservation Park, Bird Islands Conservation Park, Goose Island Conservation Park, Leven Beach Conservation Park and Innes National Park.  At the mouth of the gulf, the Gambier Islands Conservation Park is located within the Gambier Islands group.

Non-statutory arrangements

Important Bird Areas
Three Important Bird Areas (IBAs) have been nominated by BirdLife International at locations in Spencer Gulf.  The Spencer Gulf Important Bird Area lies along the north-eastern coast of the Gulf; it comprises a  strip of coastal land consisting mainly of intertidal mudflats, mangroves and salt marshes.  It was identified as an IBA by BirdLife International because of its importance for the conservation of waders, or shorebirds.  The other two IBAs within Spencer Gulf are located in the Sir Joseph Banks Group and at Goose Island. Both sites contain breeding colonies of various island seabird species.

Gallery

References

External links 
 

 
Gulfs of Australia
Bodies of water of South Australia
Coastline of South Australia
Eyre Peninsula
Aulacogens
Cenozoic rifts and grabens
IMCRA meso-scale bioregions